Andrew Dykes was a Scottish international rugby union player.

He also played for Glasgow Academicals RFC.

He played one match for the Barbarians, in 1927.

His brother Jimmy was also capped for Scotland.
He was the nephew of John Dykes, who was also capped for Scotland.

References
 Bath, Richard (ed.) The Scotland Rugby Miscellany (Vision Sports Publishing Ltd, 2007 )

Barbarian F.C. players
Scottish rugby union players
Scotland international rugby union players